Iva Várová (born December 1, 1943 in Hradec Králové) is a Czechoslovak sprint canoer who competed in the late 1960s. She finished fifth in the K-1 500 m event at the 1968 Summer Olympics in Mexico City.

References
 Sports-reference.com profile

1943 births
Canoeists at the 1968 Summer Olympics
Czechoslovak female canoeists
Czech female canoeists
Living people
Olympic canoeists of Czechoslovakia
Sportspeople from Hradec Králové